The Alfréd Radok Awards (Ceny Alfréda Radoka) were presented annually by the Endowment for the Alfréd Radok Awards in collaboration with the theatre and literary agency Aura-Pont and the magazine Svět a Divadlo (The World and Theatre) for achievements in Czech theatre, starting in 1992. The category of Best Performance was the first created. In 1995, the categories Best Play, Best Stage Design, Talent of the Year, Theatre of the Year, Best Actor, and Best Actress were created. The winners were selected by vote by theatre critics. 2013 was the last year the award ceremony was held. It was followed in 2014 by the Ceny divadelní kritiky (Theater Critics Awards), awarded by Svět a Divadlo for staging categories, and Anonymní dramatická soutěž agentury Aura-Pont (Anonymous drama competition of Aura-Pont agency).

Winners in the principal categories were as follows:

Best Actor
 1995 – Tomáš Töpfer for Jacobowski in Jacobowski and the Colonel
 1996 – Jiří Ornest for Ludwig in Ritter, Dene, Voss
 1997 – Miroslav Táborský for Jindřich in Konec masopustu
 1998 – Karel Roden for Bruno in Le Cocu Magnifique
 1999 – Martin Huba for Bruscon in Der Theatermacher
 2000 – Jan Potměšil for Richard III in Richard III
 2001 – David Prachař for Faust in Tragická historie o doktoru Faustovi
 2002 – Jan Tříska for Lear in King Lear
 2003 – Michal Čapka for Šaryk in Heart of a Dog
 2004 – Boris Rösner for Harpagon in The Miser
 2005 – Jan Vondráček for Lelio in The Liar
 2006 – Martin Finger for Světanápravce in Světanápravce (Der Weltvebesserer)
 2007 – Erik Pardus for Pavel I. in Smrt Pavla I.
 2007 – Jaroslav Plesl for Christy Mahon in The Playboy of the Western World
 2007 – Martin Finger for Josef K. in Proces
 2008 – Jaromír Dulava for Předseda in Ptákovina
 2009 – Martin Pechlát for Goebbels in  Goebbels/Baarová
 2010 – David Novotný for Muž in Muž bez minulosti
 2011 – Martin Pechlát for Andreas Karták in Legenda o svatém pijanovi
 2012 – Ivan Trojan for Bůh in Ucpanej systém
 2013 – Karel Dobrý for Opričník Andrej Danilovič in Den opričníka

Best Actress
 1994 – Barbora Hrzánová in The Seagull
 1995 – Ivana Hloužková for Maryša in Maryša
 1996 – Emília Vášáryová for The Younger Sister in Ritter, Dene, Voss
 1997 – Lucie Trmíková for Terezka in Terezka
 1998 – Iva Janžurová for Winnie in Happy Days
 1999 – Pavla Tomicová for Maryša in Maryša - po pravdě však Mařka
 2000 – Klaudia Dernerová for Katěrina Izmajlova in Lady Macbeth Mcenského újezdu
 2001 – Marie Málková for Madelaine in La Terrasse
 2002 – Marie Málková for Ms. Stavrogin in The Devils
 2003 – Marie Málková for Ms. Zittel in Heldenplatz
 2004 – Daniela Kolářová for The Mother in Am Ziel
 2005 – Jaroslava Pokorná for Hedvik in The Wild Duck
 2006 – Kate Aldrich for Sesto in La clemenza di Tito
 2007 – Helena Dvořáková for Faidra in Faidra
 2008 – Soňa Červená in Zítra se bude...
 2009 – Kateřina Burianová for Violet Westonová in Srpen v zemi indiánů
 2010 – Ivana Uhlířová for Alžběta in Víra, láska, naděje
 2011 – Helena Dvořáková for Ysé in Polední úděl
 2012 – Ivana Hloužková for Miroslav Tichý in Tichý Tarzan
 2013 – Tereza Vilišová for Amy in Můj romantický příběh

Best Play
 1995 – Sestra Úzkost by Pitínský, Čep and Deml
 1996 – Ritter, Dene, Voss by Thomas Bernhard
 1997 – Terezka by Lenka Lagronová
 1998 – Arcadia by Tom Stoppard
 1999 – Jeminkote, psohlavci by Iva Peřinová
 2000 – Faust Is Dead by Mark Ravenhill
 2001 – Tales of Common Insanity by Petr Zelenka
 2002 – The Lonesome West by Martin McDonagh
 2003 – The Lieutenant of Inishmore by Martin McDonagh
 2004 – Nagano by Martin Smolka and Jaroslav Dušek
 2005 – Akvabely by David Drábek
 2006 – Má vlast by Iva Klestilová
 2007 – Zázrak v černém domě by Milan Uhde
 2008 – Odcházení by Václav Havel
 2009 – Náměstí bratří Mašínů by David Drábek
 2010 – Očištění by Petr Zelenka
 2011 – Jedlíci čokolády by David Drábek
 2012 – Brian by Miroslav Krobot
 2013 – Plejtvák by Milan Šotek

New Artist
 1995 – Zuzana Stivínová (actress)
 1996 – Martin Dohnal (composer)
 1997 – Petra Špalková (actress)
 1998 – Petr Krušelnický (mime artist)
 1999 – Martin Čičvák (director)
 2000 – Richard Krajčo (actor)
 2001 – Miroslav Krobot (actor) /though he is a director/
 2002 – Ondřej Sokol (actor and director)
 2003 – Lucie Žáčková (actress)
 2004 – Magdaléna Borová (actress)
 2005 – Gabriela Vermelho
 2006 – Ivana Uhlířová (actress)
 2007 – Jiří Havelka (director)
 2008 – Štěpán Pácl (director)
 2009 – Vojtěch Dyk (actor)
 2010 – Štěpán Pácl (director)
 2011 – Michal Isteník (actor)
 2012 – Braňo Holiček (director, actor)
 2013 – Patrik Děrgel (actor)

References

External links
 Archived official website
 Svět a Divadlo official website
 Aura–Pont official website

Czech theatre awards
Awards established in 1992
Awards disestablished in 2014
1992 establishments in Czechoslovakia
2014 disestablishments in the Czech Republic